Aldcorn is a surname. Notable people with the surname include:

Andrew Aldcorn (1792–1877), Australian physician and politician
Gary Aldcorn (born 1935), Canadian ice hockey player

See also
Alcorn